Aanai ( Order) is a 2005 Indian Tamil language action drama film written and directed by Selva. It stars Arjun, Namitha and Keerthi Chawla in the lead, while Vadivelu, Sanghavi and Manoj K. Jayan play pivotal roles. D. Imman composed the soundtrack, while Shiva was the cinematographer for the venture which released in December 2005.

The film is a remake of the 2004 film Man on Fire  whose Hindi remake, Ek Ajnabee, starring Amitabh Bachchan in the lead, was released a week later.

Synopsis
Selva has set the story in Chennai city as some terrorist leader in London wants to kidnap children of the rich and powerful.

Plot 
Vijay (Arjun) is an ex-cop who was framed up after he cleaned the city of the scum of the earth including nine encounter killings of dreaded gangsters. Now out of work, he is persuaded by his former boss to be the bodyguard of 8-year-old Priya whose parents (Manoj K. Jayan and Sanghavi) are millionaires.

He is hired to protect the little girl from kidnappers who are on the prowl. The kidnappers are led by a loony militant called 'Ahmed Khan' who manages to kidnap Priya and humiliate Vijay. The rest of the film is how Vijay assisted by two glam girls (Namitha and Keerthi Chawla) mete out vigilante justice in a cat-and-mouse game with the kidnappers.

Cast

Production 
Selva, who had directed Arjun in Karna (1995) and the long delayed Manikanda (2006) was signed by Vasan Visual Ventures to work with him again. The actor signed on for a hiked price of one crore rupees, following the success of his previous film Giri. The unit had a 15-day shooting stint in Hyderabad in February 2005, with two of the lead actresses Namitha and Sanghavi involved in the shoot. The film featured a new editing technique tried by Satish and Harsha, while the team shot three songs with Arjun and Namitha in London, notably near the London Eye and Windsor Castle. Another song was shot with Arjun and Namitha at the Mohan Studio in Chennai, with the actor notably wearing four inch heels to make up for height difference with the actress.

During the making of the film, allegations arose that Arjun had been sending lewd messages to Namitha, which led to a brief furore on sets.

Release 
The film had a brief delay in getting released due to the failure of the actor's previous film, Chinna, though the film finally released across Tamil Nadu in early December 2005. A critic from Sify.com noted "what could have been an edge-of-the-seat thriller ends up as a badly made mass-masala movie", concluding that the film is "disappointing".

Soundtrack 

The soundtrack album was composed by D. Imman.

Track list

References

External links

2005 films
2000s Tamil-language films
Indian action films
Films scored by D. Imman
Films directed by Selva (director)
2005 action films
Indian remakes of American films